Charles Robert Reeves Hickey DFC & Bar (10 September 1897 – 3 October 1918) was a Canadian World War I flying ace, officially credited with 21 victories.  He is buried in the military cemetery in Koksijde, Belgium.

Text of citations

Distinguished Flying Cross
"Lt. Charles Robert Reeves Hickey.
Has been engaged in numerous air battles with marked success during a period of twelve months. On a recent occasion he flew to the assistance of one of our machines which was being pressed by two enemy machines and succeeded in destroying one of them."

Distinguished Flying Cross - Bar
"Lieut. (T./Capt.) Charles Robert Reeves Hickey, D.F.C., Sea Patrol (Can. Mtd. Rif.).
A very determined air fighter who has destroyed seven enemy machines and brought down nine completely out of control during the past three months. His skill and initiative as a flight commander have made his flight very successful. Last month he destroyed two machines and brought down two more out of control in one day, and the remainder of his flight, at the same time succeeded in disposing of several more enemy aircraft without sustaining any casualties."

References

Canadian aviators
Canadian World War I flying aces
1897 births
1918 deaths
People from Nanaimo
Recipients of the Distinguished Flying Cross (United Kingdom)
British military personnel killed in World War I